Pick Your Face is an Australia game show created by Banksia Productions for the Nine Network that ran from 1999 until 2003 and rerun on the Disney Channel from 2005 until 2009. It was hosted by Angus Smallwood.

Format

Round 1
Contestants had to remove items that served as clues from a large fake nose which, when gathered together would make the name of a celebrity.

Round 2 – Place the Face (Part 1)
Player one would move to the rear of the studio and play a game where they had four celebrity faces (originally three celebrities and the fourth being the player themselves) with the eyes, nose, and mouth each cut out and posted randomly around the outside of the board. The object being to put them back together in 60 seconds and getting points for guessing the celebrity successfully.

Round 3 – The Morph Mobile
Each player looked at their own photo as it slowly transformed into the face of a celebrity with more points being earned the quicker the player solved the puzzle. Each player had 30 seconds.

Place The Face (Part 2)
The second player got their opportunity to play Place The Face, as above with the same celebrities (but their own face as the fourth picture as before).

Round 4
All three players were presented with a photograph of a celebrity upon which cartoonish, grotesque features were superimposed. The players asked questions in a yes or no answer format which when answered with a yes removed the additional facial features until a contestant correctly guessed the name of the celebrity.

Place The Face (Part 3)
The third player played Place the Face as above.

Round 5 – Face Off
A trivia round where the buzzer was a touch activated giant eyeball.

Production
It was reported in Adelaide's Advertiser that some filming sessions were affected by heatwaves that hit the city in January 1999 and producers pleaded with audiences to attend.

It was also reported that Banksia Productions was in negotiation with Fox Kids in the United States to produce an American version of Pick Your Face with American contestants and host, but filmed in Adelaide.

References

External links
 
  – full episode 

Nine Network original programming
Australian children's game shows
1999 Australian television series debuts
2003 Australian television series endings
1990s Australian game shows
2000s Australian game shows
Television shows set in Adelaide